The Rad Jan Kollar cis 101 Z.C.B.J., also known as Z.C.B.J. Hall, is a historic building near Du Bois, Nebraska, United States, that was built in 1920-21. It was listed on the National Register of Historic Places in 1990.  It historically served as a meeting hall for the Czech community.

See also
 Zapadni Ceska Bratrska Jednota
 Czech-Slovak Protective Society

References

External links

Western Fraternal Life Association
Clubhouses on the National Register of Historic Places in Nebraska
Buildings and structures in Pawnee County, Nebraska
Czech-American culture in Nebraska
National Register of Historic Places in Pawnee County, Nebraska